Rifugio Vittorio Emanuele II (also quoted as Refuge Victor-Emmanuel II in French sources) is a mountain hut in the Alps in Aosta Valley, Italy.

References 

Mountain huts in the Alps
Mountain huts in Aosta Valley
Victor Emmanuel II of Italy